Derek MacCready (born May 4, 1967 in Montreal, Quebec) was a Canadian Football League defensive tackle who played eleven seasons for four teams. After retiring from his football career he became a high school Phys. Ed. teacher. His mom was Maureen Ryan and his dad was Charlie MacCready. He also had 2 brothers, Charlie, and Steven, and 3 sisters, Kelly, Sharron, and Louise, which are all Macready's. 

1967 births
Living people
Anglophone Quebec people
BC Lions players
Canadian football defensive linemen
Edmonton Elks players
Hamilton Tiger-Cats players
Ohio State Buckeyes football players
Ottawa Rough Riders players
Players of Canadian football from Quebec
Canadian football people from Montreal
Canadian players of American football